Peter Hawlik (born 13 August 1991) is an Austrian footballer currently playing for SV Mattersburg II.

External links

 

1991 births
Living people
Austrian footballers
SV Mattersburg players
Austrian Football Bundesliga players
2. Liga (Austria) players

Association football midfielders